Indianapolis mass murder may refer to:
Hamilton Avenue murders
Indianapolis FedEx shooting